Guzowy may refer to the following places in Poland:

Guzowy Młyn
Guzowy Piec